NGC 970 is an interacting galaxy pair in the constellation Triangulum. It is estimated to be 471 million light-years from the Milky Way and has a diameter of approximately 100,000 ly. The object was discovered on September 14, 1850 by Bindon Blood Stoney.

See also 
 List of NGC objects (1–1000)

Notes

References 

970
Interacting galaxies
Triangulum (constellation)
Spiral galaxies
009786